Tom Fontana (born September 12, 1951) is an American screenwriter, writer, and television producer. Fontana worked on NBC's Homicide: Life on the Street and created HBO's Oz.

Early life and education

Fontana was born on the west side of Buffalo, New York, and is the fourth of five children in an Italian-American family;  he is a cousin of actress Patti LuPone. He attended Cathedral School, Canisius High School, and Buffalo State College.  He worked at the Studio Arena Theater in Buffalo in various capacities before moving to New York City in 1973.  Fontana struggled with substance abuse for much of his early adulthood.

Career

Television

Having started out as a playwright, Fontana was hired by Bruce Paltrow as a writer for St. Elsewhere. Fontana has been a writer/producer for such series as Oz (which he also created), Copper, The Jury, The Beat, The Bedford Diaries, Homicide: Life on the Street, and The Philanthropist.

Fontana wrote the HBO film Strip Search, directed by Sidney Lumet, and contributed two pieces to the September 11 special,  America: A Tribute to Heroes.  He was the executive producer of American Tragedy for CBS, Shot in the Heart for HBO Films, the independent film Jean, and the documentary The Press Secretary for PBS. Fontana also created the historical drama TV series Borgia for the French premium-pay channel Canal+, produced by Atlantique Productions and EOS Entertainment. The series recounts the Borgia family's rise to power and subsequent domination of the Vatican during the Renaissance. Fontana also co-created Copper, an 1860s police procedural set in the turbulent Five Points neighborhood of New York.

Fontana has received three Emmy Awards, four Peabody Awards, three Writers' Guild Awards, four Television Critics Association Awards, the Cable Ace Award, the Humanitas Prize, an Edgar Award, and the first prize at the Cinéma Tout Ecran Festival in Switzerland.  In 2003, Fontana was the recipient of the Austin Film Festival's Outstanding Television Writer Award.

Articles
Fontana has written articles for such periodicals as The New York Times, TV Guide, and Esquire, and has taught at Columbia, Syracuse, Rutgers, and the State University College at Buffalo, his alma mater, from which he received the Distinguished Alumni Award and an honorary Doctorate of Letters.

Plays
Fontana has had numerous plays produced in New York City, where he lives, and at San Francisco's American Conservatory Theater, the Cincinnati Playhouse in the Park, the Buffalo Studio Arena Theatre, Williamstown Theatre Festival, and McCarter Theatre Company.

Personal life

Fontana's sister is a nun.  He lives in New York City's West Village in a building that was formerly a branch of the New York Public Library. The book-lined, two-story main reading room is now a living room where he often hosts fund raisers for arts and civil-rights organizations.

Fontana was married to actress Sagan Lewis for 12 years until their divorce in 1993. Sagan and Fontana remarried on July 10, 2015, and remained together until her death on August 7, 2016.

Fontana has a tattoo of the Oz logo on his upper right arm, which he is shown receiving in the opening credits of the series.

Fontana does not own or use a computer, and writes all of his scripts longhand on a yellow legal pad.

Membership
He is a member of the Dramatists Guild, the Producers Guild of America, and the Writers Guild of America, East, from which he received the Evelyn F. Burkey Award for lifetime achievement. Fontana served as vice president of the Writers Guild of America, East from 2005 to 2007. He is president emeritus of the WGAE Foundation, commonly known as the Writers Guild Initiative, and serves on the boards of the Acting Company, the Williamstown Theatre Festival, DEAL, the New York City Police Museum, and Stockings With Care, among others.

Detective Joe Fontana, Dennis Farina's character on Law & Order, was named for Tom Fontana, who became close friends with Law & Order creator Dick Wolf while working as writers in the same building, at the same time, on the series St. Elsewhere (Fontana) and Hill Street Blues (Wolf).

Filmography

Film

Television

References

External links
 Official Website
 New York Magazine Tom Fontana profile and The Jury preview
 Board of Advisors, The Buffalo Film Festival, Buffalo, NY, United States
 Tom Fontana interview at Archive of American Television
 Tom Fontana’s ‘Borgia’ at the Hollywood Reporter
 Deauville 2011: Tom Fontana Discusses 'Borgia's' Move to Netflix, Plans for Cable (Q&A) at the Hollywood Reporter
 

American television writers
American male television writers
1951 births
Buffalo State College alumni
Edgar Award winners
American writers of Italian descent
Living people
Writers from Buffalo, New York
Showrunners
Screenwriters from New York (state)